This is a list of the World War II divisions of the Royal Italian Army of the Kingdom of Italy.

Alpine Divisions 
  1st Alpine Division "Taurinense" (Turin)
  2nd Alpine Division "Tridentina" (Trento)
  3rd Alpine Division "Julia" (Julian March)
  4th Alpine Division "Cuneense" (Cuneo)
  5th Alpine Division "Pusteria" (Puster)
  6th Alpine Division "Alpi Graie" (Graian Alps)

Armored Divisions
  131st Armored Division "Centauro" (Centaur)
  132nd Armored Division "Ariete" (Ares)
  133rd Armored Division "Littorio" (Lictor) 
  134th Armored Division "Freccia" (Arrow)
  135th Armored Cavalry Division "Ariete" (Ares)
  136th Armored Legionary Division "Centauro" (Centaur)
 136th Armored Division "Giovani Fascisti" (Fascist Youth)

Blackshirt Divisions
  1st CC.NN. Division "23 Marzo" (23rd March)
  2nd CC.NN. Division "28 Ottobre" (28th October)
  3rd CC.NN. Division "21 Aprile" (21st April) 
  4th CC.NN. Division "3 Gennaio" (3rd January)
 1st CC.NN. Armored Division "M" (Mussolini)

Cavalry Divisions
  1st Cavalry Division "Eugenio di Savoia" (Eugene of Savoy)
  2nd Cavalry Division "Emanuele Filiberto Testa di Ferro" ([[Emmanuel Philibert, Duke of Savoy|Emmanuel Philibert Ironhead]])
  3rd Cavalry Division "Principe Amedeo Duca d'Aosta" (Prince Amedeo, Duke of Aosta)

Coastal Divisions
 201st Coastal Division
 202nd Coastal Division
 203rd Coastal Division
 204th Coastal Division
 205th Coastal Division
 206th Coastal Division
 207th Coastal Division
 208th Coastal Division
 209th Coastal Division
 210th Coastal Division
 211th Coastal Division
 212th Coastal Division
 213th Coastal Division
 214th Coastal Division
 215th Coastal Division
 216th Coastal Division
 220th Coastal Division
 221st Coastal Division
 222nd Coastal Division
 223rd Coastal Division
 224th Coastal Division
 225th Coastal Division
 226th Coastal Division
 227th Coastal Division
 230th Coastal Division

Colonial Divisions

Libyan 
 1st Libyan Division
 2nd Libyan Division

Somalian 
 101st Colonial Somalian Division
 102nd Colonial Somalian Division

Infantry Divisions

Air-transportable 
  80th Infantry Division "La Spezia" (La Spezia)

Auto-transportable 
  9th Infantry Division "Pasubio" (Pasubio)
  10th Infantry Division "Piave" /  10th Motorized Division "Piave" (Piave)
  52nd Infantry Division "Torino" (Turin)
  103rd Infantry Division "Piacenza" (Piacenza)
  104th Infantry Division "Mantova" (Mantua)
  105th Infantry Division "Rovigo" (Rovigo)

Auto-transportable North-African Type
  17th Infantry Division "Pavia" (Pavia)
  25th Infantry Division "Bologna" (Bologna)
  27th Infantry Division "Brescia" (Brescia)
  55th Infantry Division "Savona" (Savona)
  60th Infantry Division "Sabratha" (Sabratha)
  61st Infantry Division "Sirte" (Sirte)
  62nd Infantry Division "Marmarica" (Marmarica)
  63rd Infantry Division "Cirene" (Cyrene)
  64th Infantry Division "Catanzaro" (Catanzaro)

Infantry 
  5th Infantry Division "Cosseria" (Cosseria)
  6th Infantry Division "Cuneo" (Cuneo)
  7th Infantry Division "Lupi di Toscana" (Wolves of Tuscany)
  12th Infantry Division "Sassari" (Sassari)
  13th Infantry Division "Re" (King's)
  14th Infantry Division "Isonzo" (Isonzo)
  15th Infantry Division "Bergamo" (Bergamo)
  16th Infantry Division "Pistoia" /  16th Motorized Division "Pistoia" (Pistoia)
  18th Infantry Division "Messina" (Messina)
  20th Infantry Division "Friuli" (Friuli)
  21st Infantry Division "Granatieri di Sardegna" (Grenadiers of Sardinia)
  22nd Infantry Division "Cacciatori delle Alpi" (Hunters of the Alps)
  24th Infantry Division "Pinerolo" (Pinerolo)
  28th Infantry Division "Aosta"  (Aosta)
  29th Infantry Division "Piemonte" (Piedmont)
  30th Infantry Division "Sabauda" (Savoy) 
  31st Infantry Division "Calabria" (Calabria)
  40th Infantry Division "Cacciatori d'Africa" (Hunters of Africa)
  41st Infantry Division "Firenze" (Florence)
  44th Infantry Division "Cremona" (Cremona)
  47th  Infantry Division "Bari" (Bari)
  48th Infantry Division "Taro" (Taro)
  49th Infantry Division "Parma" (Parma)
  50th Infantry Division "Regina" (Queen's)
  51st Infantry Division "Siena" (Siena)
  54th Infantry Division "Napoli" (Naples)
  56th Infantry Division "Casale" (Casale)
  57th  Infantry Division "Lombardia" (Lombardy)
  58th Infantry Division "Legnano" (Legnano)
  65th Infantry Division "Granatieri di Savoia" (Grenadiers of Savoy)

Mountain 
  1st Infantry Division "Superga" (Superga)
  2nd Infantry Division "Sforzesca" (Sforzesca)
  3rd Infantry Division "Ravenna" (Ravenna)
  4th Infantry Division "Livorno" (Livorno)
  11th Infantry Division "Brennero" (Brenner)
  19th Infantry Division "Venezia" (Venice)
  23rd Infantry Division "Ferrara" (Ferrara)
  26th Infantry Division "Assietta" (Assietta)]
  32nd Infantry Division "Marche" (Marche)
  33rd Infantry Division "Acqui" (Acqui)
  36th Infantry Division "Forlì" (Forlì)
  37th Infantry Division "Modena" (Modena)
  38th Infantry Division "Puglie" (Puglia)
  53rd Infantry Division "Arezzo" (Arezzo)
  59th Infantry Division "Cagliari" (Cagliari)

Occupation 
  151st Infantry Division "Perugia" (Perugia)
  152nd Infantry Division "Piceno" (Piceno)
  153rd Infantry Division "Macerata" (Macerata)
  154th Infantry Division "Murge" (Murge)
  155th Infantry Division "Emilia" (Emilia)
  156th Infantry Division "Vicenza" (Vicenza)
  157th Infantry Division "Novara" (Novara)
  158th Infantry Division "Zara" (Zara)
  159th Infantry Division "Veneto" (Veneto)

Marching 
 8th Marching Division

Motorized 
  10th Motorized Division "Piave" (former 10th Infantry Division "Piave") (Piave)
  16th Motorized Division "Pistoia" (former 16th Infantry Division "Pistoia") (Pistoia)
  101st Motorized Division "Trieste" (Trieste)
  102nd Motorized Division "Trento" (Trento)

Paratrooper Divisions
 183rd Paratroopers Division "Ciclone" (Cyclone)
 184th Paratroopers Division "Nembo" (Nimbus)
 185th Paratroopers Division "Folgore" (Lightning)

See also
 Italian Co-belligerent Army
 Royal Italian Army during World War II

Italian Divisions
 
 
Lists of military units and formations of Italy
Lists of divisions (military formations)